Wilamowo  is a village in the administrative district of Gmina Kętrzyn, within Kętrzyn County, Warmian-Masurian Voivodeship, in northern Poland.

Until 1934 it belonged to the Carlshof Institutions, during World War II the airfield of the Wolf's Lair, Hitler's headquarter in East Prussia, was located within the village.

The village has a population of 10.

References

Villages in Kętrzyn County